This is a list of driver records in the FIA Formula E Championship, since 2014–15. Drivers who have competed in the 2021–22 Formula E season are highlighted in bold.

This page is accurate up to the end of the 2021 Berlin ePrix.

Races entered and started
Drivers are considered to be "entered" into a race if they attempt to compete in at least one official practice session with the intent of entering the race. These drivers are noted on the "entry list" for that race. A driver is considered to have started a race if they line-up on the grid (or at the pitlane exit) for the start of a race

Total entries

Total starts

Youngest drivers to start a race

Oldest drivers to start a race

Oldest drivers to enter a race

Most consecutive race starts
Most consecutive races that the driver entered and actually started.

Most consecutive race entries

Wins

Total wins

Percentage wins

Most wins in a season

Highest percentage of wins in a season

Most consecutive wins

Most consecutive wins from first race of season

Most wins in first championship season

Fewest races before first win

Most races before first win

Most races without a win

Most podiums without a win

Wins from furthest back on the start grid

Most wins at the same ePrix

Youngest winners
(only the first win for each driver is listed)

Oldest winners
(only the last win for each driver is listed)

Most wins by drivers that have not won a championship

Pole positions

Total pole positions

Percentage pole positions

Most consecutive pole positions

Most pole positions in a season

Highest percentage of pole positions in a season

Most pole positions at the same ePrix

Youngest polesitters
(only the first pole position for each driver is listed)

Oldest polesitters
(only the last pole position for each driver is listed)

Most races without a pole position

Fastest laps

Total fastest laps

Percentage fastest laps

Most consecutive fastest laps

Most fastest laps in a season

Highest percentage of fastest laps in a season

Youngest drivers to set fastest lap
(only the first fastest lap for each driver is listed)

Oldest drivers to set fastest lap
(only the last fastest lap for each driver is listed)

Podium finishes

Total podium finishes

Percentage podium finishes

Most podium finishes in a season

Most consecutive podium finishes

Most consecutive podium finishes from first race of season

Youngest drivers to score a podium finish
(only the first podium finish for each driver is listed)

Oldest drivers to score a podium finish
(only the last podium finish for each driver is listed)

Most races without a podium

Most career podiums without a championship

Most races before scoring a podium finish

Points

Career points

Total races scoring points
This includes points for pole position and/or fastest lap.

Most consecutive races with points

Most consecutive points scored

Most points in a season

Youngest drivers to score points
(only the first points finish for each driver is listed)

Oldest drivers to score points
(only the last points finish for each driver is listed)

Most points without a win

Most races before scoring points

Highest average points per race entered

Race leaders

Most laps led, total

For at least one lap, total

Every lap, total

Races finished

Total career race finishes

Most consecutive race finishes

Fanboost

Total fanboost

Other driver records

Footnotes

External links
 

Formula E
Formula E